Microcleptes aranea is a species of beetle in the family Cerambycidae. It was described by Newman in 1840. It is known from Chile.

References

Parmenini
Beetles described in 1840
Endemic fauna of Chile